Soweto Community Television (Soweto TV) is a South African community television channel broadcasting in the biggest township in South Africa, Soweto. The channel is free-to-air in Gauteng Province and it also broadcast to South African subscribers on the DStv pay TV service on channel 251 and Starsat on channel 488.

The channel's main studios are situated on one of the most popular streets in Soweto, Vilakazi Street; well known for being the only street in the world to have the historical residences of two Nobel Prize winners, namely Nelson Mandela and Archbishop Desmond Tutu. The channel also has studios in Diepkloof, near the largest hospital in Africa, The Chris Hani Baragwanath Hospital in Soweto, South Africa.

Company history

Early history 
Soweto TV was founded by Mr Ephraim Tshepo Thafeng in 2005, who was then both the CEO and head of marketing for the community channel then. The channel received a 24-day special events broadcasting licence, from the Independent Communications Authority of South Africa (ICASA) which would see the it broadcasting eight hours a day, from 26 November 2005 till mid-December. Despite financial constraints, Soweto TV started broadcasting to millions of Soweto residents from Saturday, 26 November as scheduled. The month-long broadcast was themed, 'World Aids Day' which falls on 1 December. The Dobsonville Shopping Mall provided some funding for basic staff needs, while the state-owned SABC financed the studio and installation. Volunteers; people like the late Force Khashane, Maril,Smarty Oliphant, media students from the community, team from GDTV namely Sthembiso Xaba, Nkalipho Nesheshe and Thami Mpisane provided manpower for the duration of the broadcasts.

Following the success of the broadcast, the channel received another special events broadcasting licence in 2006 and they completed another successful broadcast.

In 2007, the Soweto TV received a longer license which would see it broadcasting for a year. The license meant the channel would be live and uninterrupted for 24 hours a day from 1 July 2007 until 30 June 2008.

In May 2008, the channel submitted an application for a new licence, but the expiry date for the previous license, came and went without the channel receiving a new license due to a back-log at ICASA. The channel's future seemed uncertain despite successfully broadcasting for a year. Despite not having a license, the channel was allowed to continue broadcasting whilst ICASA was processing the application, though terms of the Electronic Communications Act of 2005, which stated that: no-one may broadcast without a licence.

In line with the ICASA community television licence provisions, Urban Brew Studios put together a community training programme based upon the Soweto TV channel platform.

In 2010 the channel was granted its first seven-year broadcasting license by ICASA. Soon after, the channel announced a new chairman, Mr. Murphy Morobe, who was also the CEO of Kagiso Media. The channel, a non-profit entity, supported by Urban Brew Studios — a subsidiary of Kagiso Media.

In 2013 the channel went regional, with the installation of a new antenna. This meant viewers would be able to watch Soweto TV across Gauteng. The 360-degree antenna would allow viewers across a wider geographical area absolute access to the channel at no extra cost. The station opened its spread on 16 June 2013. It came after the old Bop TV transmitter was removed, which had restricted the TV station to broadcasting locally, only reaching Soweto. With the new antenna, Soweto TV would reach as far as Heidelberg, Benoni, Springs and Nigel in the east; Tembisa, Vanderbijlpark, Vereeniging and Sasolburg in the south; and Pretoria North and Mamelodi in the north

Recent history
In August 2018, Soweto TV announced Bridget Nkuna as their new CEO.  Nkuna was appointed by the channel; because her strong marketing background, having worked as a director for Westcon Group, an international technology company. In the media space, she had a stint at the former Voice of Soweto, now known as Jozi FM. She also worked for the SABC as a continuity presenter. “I am delighted to be joining the Soweto TV team, it brings me right back to my passion which is entertainment and broadcasting," Nkuna said on her appointment. "It is our role help uplift and support the community using one of the most powerful mediums – television.” she added. With her marketing background and experience within the media space, she hit the ground running, re-branding the channel and revealing the channel's new logo within a month of being in the channel. In October 2018 she revealed new state-of-the-art broadcasting equipment donated by MultiChoice “We’re excited about the donation as it came at the right time when we are celebrating our 11th birthday. Community TV channels fulfil a very important role in communities – we tell the stories of our community and create a sense of belonging. We’re looking forward to continuing to play our role in the stories of the people of Soweto.”

On 30 June 2018 Soweto TV founder and board member, Mr. Thafeng, tendered a formal resignation as board member of the channel. On 4 July 2019, he announced that he was cutting ties with the channel, citing toxicity within the board and the ill management of the channel.

Months later, the remaining board members would also resign from the board leaving only Mr. Tuis Jabulani Nkutha in the board. Following the decision by the board to step down, ICASA gave the only remaining board member, Mr Nkutha and CEO, Ms Nkuna a mandated to appoint people from the community to a steering committee that would be in charge at the channel for six months in preparation for the Annual General Meeting (AGM). In an article, it would be alleged that Nkutha and Nkuna appointed their own preferred people to the board, who also happened to be their personal friends. Soon after the new board was appointed, Ms. Nkuna, was placed on special leave. Board member, Thabo Molefe also known as Tbo Touch was then appointed the channel's acting CEO.

His appointment promised to bring positive change to the channel. As part of his first project, he organised a soccer tournament where soccer legends played a heritage game against local celebrities at Soweto Nike Stadium on 24 September and promised he would be rolling out documentary series, reality TV shows and soapies that resonate with the local market in the next coming months.

His appointment including of the board didn't come without controversy.

It is alleged that at his first meeting with the Soweto TV staff he threatened staff, saying they [board members] are not afraid of anyone and they have a budget for CCMA and any court action taken against them.

By the end of 2019, it was reported to ICASA that an illegitimate board had been appointed and was running the channel. Speaking to Sowetan LIVE in an article released on 17 January 2020, Mr. Thafeng said ICASA was fully aware of what's happening at the channel but was not doing anything about it. ICASA spokesperson Paseka Maleka confirmed receipt of the complaint in relation to the election of the board. "The complaints and compliance commission is investigating the matter," he said.

Content Producers Suspended 
Upon returning from festive season holidays on 6 January 2020, 9 Soweto TV producers (Ayanda Dyantyi, Cinderella Mpahlwa, Dennis Segwe, Jonathan Ramotsei, Masego Ruele, Nompilo Mlotshwa, Samulelisiwe Sibiya, Sipho Mpungose and Themba Thanjekwayo) were placed on suspension without being charged. About two weeks would pass till they were charged with gross negligence or, failing to perform duties without proper cause, loss of revenue and viewership for the channel and failing to sign a performance contract during November 2019.

On 27 January 2020 the channel's Chairperson, Mr Spencer Malongete addressing the suspension of the channel's producers amongst other things.  The statement read: Soweto TV has been mismanaged for a decade and was on the verge of liquidation when all the members of the board resigned with immediate effect leaving only 1 board member who also one of the founding members of Soweto. The regulator ICASA instructed the remaining member to properly constitute a team of directors who will stabilize the channel and take it forward.

The new board appointed an investigator and the following was discovered:

• Soweto TV has not been compliant with the regulator ICASA in News and factual content.

• The channel accumulated an unpaid SARS bill amounting to R14,439 400 million rand.

• No performance management or monitoring contracts to measure deliverables and accountability.

• The channel had excessive amount of repeats for the year 2017, 2018 and 2019 with constant incorrect electronic program guide for viewers

• The previous management never submitted Tax returns for years with violations and penalties from the revenue service

• There was no policy or any form of governance on the day to day operations, service providers were appointed with no procurement processes and business processes were compromised

• Churches and key community organizations terminated their contracts with the Channel

• Channel had 84 staff members, a couple of them were ‘ghosts’ employees earning a salary with no trace of working at Soweto TV, some have been with the channel for almost a decade with no contribution to the Channel.

Interventions to date:

 The Board has alleviated the risk of the channel from being liquidated.

The Board has engaged ICASA and relevant stake holders on its plans to stabilize the channel and ensure that Soweto TV succeeds. The board took a resolution to appoint Mr. Thabo Molefe as the new Acting CEO and the following has been effected:

• Since September 2019, the channel has committed to paying the receiver and has reduced the bill from R14 439 400 to R4 567 000.

• The channel has complied with the local content regulation and continues to reflect the community back to the audience.

• The channel has instituted both an acquisition and editorial policy putting Soweto TV amongst the leading broadcaster’s in South Africa

• We’ve implemented new automated commercial systems that enables advertisers and sales agencies to monitor their investment and maintain schedule stability

• The channel has formulated policies that speaks to governance, accountability and performance.

• The channel has attended Multichoice content and management workshops

• The channel has hosted auditions for new shows with new faces to be introduced in February 2020.

• 9 New shows have been produced and being released throughout the next months

• The brand of Soweto TV has been revived and in 2020 the audience will have an opportunity to view more local content and engage with a number of new initiatives. The new Board is committed to the success of Soweto TV. Once we have achieved programming and commercial stability, the Board will roll out the next phase of its work programme which shall consist of increased community engagement including scheduling editorial consultations as well as membership rules to enable increased community participation. The new Board will not be distracted by the opportunistic campaigns which are waged by people who have failed the Channel before. The community must not be misled by such people.On Friday, 6 March 2020, all the producers received emails dismissing them from the channel. The producers have taken the matter to the CCMA.

Awards and nominations  

 Winner of "Best Women in Media Professional - Nyiko Khosa" at the Global Brands Awards 2019
Winner of "Best News Presenter - Lieketseng Tabi" at the Black Entertainment Awards 2019
Winner of "Best News Entertainment Show - Kasi Vibes" at the Black Entertainment Awards 2019
Winner of "Best Community TV Gospel Show - According to The Bible" at the 5th INGOMA 2018 
Winner of "Best Cultural Electronic Media Journalist - Sakhile Sithole" at the 13th SATMA 2018
 Winner of "Community Media of The Year" at the Gauteng Sports Awards 2018
 Winner of "Sports Programme of The Year - Dlala Mzansi - Vuyo Macoba, Malwandla Hlekane, Mbali Nkosi" at the Gauteng Sports Awards 2018
 Winner of "Best Gospel TV Show - Gospel Countdown" at the Crown Gospel Awards 2018
 Nominated for "Best Gospel TV Show - Apozion" at the Crown Gospel Awards 2018
 Nominated for "Best Gospel TV Show - Gospel Countdown" at the Crown Gospel Awards 2018
Nominated for "Sport Programme of the Year - Dlala Mzansi - Vuyo Macoba, Malwandla Hlekane, Mbali Nkosi" at Gauteng Sports Awards 2017
Winner of "M&G Community Media Journalist of the Year" at the Township Entrepreneurship Awards 2017
Nominated for "Best Gospel TV Show - Gospel Countdown" at the Crown Gospel Awards 2017
 Winner of "Best Community Presenter - Ndumiso Dhlamini [Apozion]" at the 4th INGOMA 2017
Winner of "Best Clap and Tap Music Show - Apozion" at the Mmino wa Clap and Tap Awards 2017
 Winner of "Community Media of The Year" at the KZN Capital Maskandi Awards 2017
 Winner of "Best Community TV Gospel Show" - Apozion" at the 4th INGOMA 2016
 Winner of "Best Gospel Show - Apozion" at the Crown Gospel Awards 2016 
 Winner for "Community Media of The Year" at the Gauteng Sports Awards 2016
 Nominated for "Sports Programme of The Year - Dipapadi" at the Gauteng Sports Awards 2016
Winner of "Best Gospel Show - According to The Bible" at the Crown Gospel Awards 2014

Programming 

Soweto TV programming is mostly Sowetan content as per ICASA's regulations of over 60% local content.

According to The Bible - Is a multi-award winning religious show hosted by Lehlohonolo Patrick Ledwaba & Mtimande Lethukuthula which looks into the Bible as a guideline on how we should be living our lives daily. 
Sisemoyeni - A gospel show hosted by Matthews Moloi. This show aims to uplift viewers through the gospel. Moloi profiles gospel musicians, church leaders, and the people behind your favorite music.
Reggae Vibes - A reggae show hosted by Sipho "Ras Sipho" Mantula, which is catered for lovers of reggae music. The show profiles reggae artists, supporters of the Rasta community and shares stories about the Rastafarian communities all across the world.
Kasi Kitchen -  A cooking show hosted by Sinesipho Sihomo which goes into ordinary people's kitchens, who share with us some of their favourite meals and age old family recipes with us.
Kasi Vibes - A weekly music video show which brings you fresh music videos from Africa and across the world.
Apozion - An award-winning gospel show which plays the best Apostolic and Zion music from all over the country.
Choral Sounds - A show that brings you world-class choral music from all over the world, hosted by Ndoni Radebe & Thabang Neko
Edu-Space - An educational show hosted by Gugulethu Mtshali, that takes Soweto students on a journey into different universities and colleges exploring various career options.
Izigi Zomzansi -  A traditional music show which takes viewers through a South African traditional musical journey.
News & Views -  A current Affairs show hosted by seasoned broadcaster, Lucas Kgaphola which aims to share news of the community and engage viewers about the matters to explore possible solutions.
Phaphama - A health show hosted by Phumelele Dlamini dealing with health matters, from HIV to Cancer and other health issues that affect people of Soweto, Africa and the world at large.
Soul Of Jazz - A Jazz and Rhythm & blues show hosted by Sibongile "Bongi M" Motlhasedi for lovers of soulful music.
Ultimate Sistas - This talk show is all about feminism hosted by Dikeledi Tshabalala and Tsakane Mangwane. The show explores topics about women empowerment, daily challenges faced by women and celebrates women making a difference in their communities and the world.
Dlala Ngeringas - Hosted by Rufus "Dj Rhee" Moremi. Dlala Ngeringas brings together young people from all walks of life to discuss issues that affect young people nationally and gives them the opportunities to come up with solutions to their problems.
Your Late Mate - A variety show hosted by seasoned broadcaster, Nimrod Nkosi. A lively, witty, tongue-in cheek late night show that features celebrity interviews, politicians, entrepreneurs, artist and extraordinary members of the community. In this show, viewers get to see Nimrod like they've never seen him before,
MovieBox - Do you love movies? Then this show is just for you. We get to see all the movies currently on circuit, behind the scenes to your favorite movies and sit down with your favorite actors to get to know them outside of the big screens.
The Take Off - The Take Off Is a daily breakfast show that showcases lifestyle, entertainment, trending fashion and celebrity interviews done by Tbo Touch, Kamo Moth, Carpo and Innocent Matijane.
Rev It Up - Mzansi's favorite car review show, that travels the country profiling petrol heads, look into what powers your favorite machines and look at what innovations your favorite car brands have next for you. 
Dlala Mzansi - This award-winning sports show created by Vuyo Macoba, Malwandla Hlekane and Mbali Nkosi, currently hosted by Lindokuhle Jiyane and Thembisile Baai, brings you all the local sports codes. We get to sit down with your favorite sports stars, profile upcoming players in the field of sports and bring you lifestyle features.
The Mentality with Banele Rewo- Banele Rewo interviews Soweto’s Grootmans on how to navigate life, business, physical and mental health as a man''

References 

Television channels and stations established in 2005
Television stations in South Africa
English-language television stations in South Africa
Mass media in Soweto